Fedoseyevka is a rural locality (a selo) in Starooskolsky District, Belgorod Oblast, Russia. The population was 2,766 as of 2010. There are 94 streets.

Geography 
Fedoseyevka is located 7 km north of Stary Oskol (the district's administrative centre) by road. Kaplino is the nearest rural locality.

References 

Rural localities in Starooskolsky District